Nomad was a house music duo from the United Kingdom, who had several hits on the US Hot Dance Club Play chart, as well as successes on the UK Singles Chart. Group members were Damon Rochefort (Nomad is Damon spelled backwards, thus the group's name), Steve McCutcheon and Sharon D. Clarke. 

In 1991, they hit number 1 on the US Dance chart and number 2 in the UK with the song "(I Wanna Give You) Devotion", billed as Nomad featuring MC Mikee Freedom. Their follow-up single, "Just a Groove", reached number 16 on the UK Singles Chart.

Another single was "Something Special", also from the album Changing Cabins. Then followed "Your Love Is Lifting Me" and "24 Hours a Day". There was due to be a second album, entitled Different Drum, but this never materialised.

Discography

Album

Singles

See also
List of number-one dance hits (United States)
List of artists who reached number one on the US Dance chart

References

External links
 

English house music duos
English electronic music groups